Bent-Jorgen Perlmutt is an American director, writer, producer, and film professor at Princeton University. He is best known for his documentary films ReMastered: Massacre at the Stadium, Havana Motor Club, Diana Vreeland: The Eye Has to Travel, and Lumo.

Life and career
Perlmutt was born in New York City, NY and grew up in Chapel Hill, NC. He holds a B.A. with honors from Brown University in 2001 and an M.F.A. with honors from Columbia University in 2007. In 2007, he won a Student Academy Award for his documentary Lumo. In 2008, he won Focus Features' Best Director Award at the Columbia University Film Festival for his narrative short Les Vulnerables and was named one of Filmmaker Magazine's "25 New Faces of Indie Film". His most recent film, ReMastered: Massacre at the Stadium,  was nominated for an Emmy Award in 2020.

Perlmutt is a member of the Directors Guild of America (DGA), the National Board of Review (NBR), and has received multiple film grants from the Sundance Institute for his narrative projects. He has taught filmmaking at Columbia University and William Paterson University, and currently teaches at Princeton University.

Filmography

As actor
 2004 : Brother to Brother

Awards and nominations

References

External links
 

American documentary film directors
American documentary film producers
Living people
Year of birth missing (living people)